Uqsha Wallqa (Quechua uqsha a high altitude grass, wallqa collar, hispanicized spelling Ocsahualca) is a mountain in the Paryaqaqa mountain range in the Andes of Peru, about  high. It is situated in the Lima Region, Huarochirí Province, on the border of the districts of San Mateo and Quinti. It lies northwest of Paqcha and Wararayuq and southeast of Wamanripa.

References 

Mountains of Peru
Mountains of Lima Region